Ham Tin is the name of several places in Hong Kong, including:

 Ham Tin, a village in Pui O, Lantau Island
 Ham Tin, a village facing Tai Long Wan, Sai Kung District
 Ham Tin Tsuen, a village in Tai Wo Hau, Kwai Chung

It is also part of the name of:
 Ham Tin Shan, the former name of Lam Tin